The BL 16-inch Mark I was a British naval gun introduced in the 1920s and used on the two Nelson-class battleships.

Description
These wire-wound built-up guns had originally been planned for the cancelled G3-class battlecruiser design upon which the Nelson class drew.

Sir W. G. Armstrong Whitworth & Company at Elswick, Vickers at Barrow-in-Furness, William Beardmore & Company at Dalmuir and the Royal Gun Factory at Woolwich made a total of 29 guns of which 18 would be required for both ships at any time.

These guns broke with the example offered by the earlier 15-inch Mk I gun, which fired a heavy shell at a rather low muzzle velocity, and instead fired a rather light shell at a high muzzle velocity; this was not a success, as at the initial muzzle velocity the gun wore down rapidly and the accuracy was unsatisfactory, so much that it was lowered. Furthermore, a heavier shell was proposed but not adopted because of stringent budget policies of the 1930s; therefore, this naval gun wasn't seen as particularly successful.

An improved weapon, the BL 16-inch Mark II was designed for the Lion-class battleship which was a successor to the King George V class taking advantage of the larger weapon allowed under the London Naval Treaty from March 1938.  
Construction of first two Lion-class battleships - each of which was to have nine 16-inch guns - was halted at the start of the Second World War; only a few months after they were laid down. Work on the armament continued for a while but that was also stopped after only four guns and no turrets were produced.

See also

Weapons of comparable role, performance and era
 41 cm/45 3rd Year Type naval gun: Japanese equivalent
 16"/45 caliber Mk 1, 5 & 8 gun: American equivalent

Notes

References

External links

 Tony DiGiulian, British 16"/45 (40.6 cm) Mark I
 Terry Duncan, British 16" Mark I Gun and Mounting

World War II naval weapons of the United Kingdom
Naval guns of the United Kingdom
400 mm artillery
Military equipment introduced in the 1920s